The Moluccan moray eel (Gymnothorax moluccensis) is a moray eel found in coral reefs in the western Pacific and Indian Oceans. It was first named by Pieter Bleeker in 1864.

References

moluccensis
Fish described in 1864